The Sør Rondane Mountains are a group of mountains about 100 miles (160 km) long with main peaks rising to 3400 m, between the Queen Fabiola Mountains and Wohlthat Mountains in Queen Maud Land. They were discovered and photographed from the air by members of the Lars Christensen Expedition (LCE) on February 6, 1937, and named after Rondane, a mountain massif in southern Norway. The mountains and their constituent features were mapped in greater detail and named in 1957 by Norwegian cartographers working with air photos taken by U.S. Navy Operation Highjump, 1946–47.

Features

Mountains
"Austhamaren" means "the east hammer."
"Austhjelmen" means the "east helmet."
Named for Bernt Balchen, famous Norwegian polar aviator.
"Bamsefjell" means "bear mountain."
"Bautaen" means "the monolith."
Named for Ambassador Birger Bergersen. A prominent rock pinnacle called Tårnet Pinnacle ("the tower") sits on its northwest side.
Named for United States Navy Captain Charles A. Bond, commander of the Western Group of Operation Highjump.
Named for Captain Otto Borchgrevink, leader of the Norwegian whaling expedition 1930–31.
"Brattnipane" means the "steep peaks."
Named for Antarctic explorer Hallvard Devold.
It was named for Rear Admiral George J. Dufek, commander of the Eastern Group of Operation Highjump.
"Dungane" means "the heaps."
Named mechanic Tom Fidjeland of the Lars Christensen Expedition (LCE) 1936–37.
Named for Major Gunnar Isachsen, the leader with Captain Hjalmar Riiser-Larsen of the Norwegian expedition 1930–31.
Named for Antarctic explorer Olav Kjelbotn.
"Komsa" means "the Lapp cradle."
Named for Norwegian cartographer Bernhard Luncke.
"Mefjell" means "middle mountain".
"Menipa" means "middle peak."
Named for Captain Nils Larsen, leader of the Norwegian expedition 1928–29.
Discovered by the Belgian Antarctic Expedition of 1957–1958 and named for expedition member Prince Antoine de Ligne.
Rogers Peaks: a small group of peaks standing just southwest of Dufek. Named for US Navy Lt. Commander William J. Rogers, aerial crew commander with Operation Highjump.
"Salen" means "the saddle"; named for its shape.
Named for LCE photographer Erik Simensen.
"Sørhjelmen" means "the south helmet."
Named for one of the LCE mechanics.
"Tanngarden" means "the row of teeth."
Tustane Peaks: a group of peaks at the head of Koms Glacier. "Tustane" means "the clumps".
Named "Tvetaggen" meaning "the double prongs" because of their appearance.
"Vesthjelmen" means "the west helmet." Hjelmkalven Point is a rocky point on its north side.
"Vikinghogda" means "the Viking heights."
Named for Ragnvald Walnum, one-time chairman of the Norwegian Whaling Board.
Mount Widerøe: a large mountain rising to 2,994 m between Walnum and Nils Larsen. Named for LCE pilot Viggo Widerøe. Vengen Spur ("the wing") projects north from the east part of Widerøe.

Glaciers 

 Borchgrevinkisen
 Byrdbreen
 Ellis Glacier
 Fimbulheimen
 Gillock Glacier
 Gjel Glacier
 Glitrefonna Glacier
 Gunnestad Glacier
 Hansenbreen
 Hargreavesbreen
 Hette Glacier
 Jennings Glacier
 Kamp Glacier
 Koms Glacier
 Kreitzerisen
 Mefjell Glacier
 Mjell Glacier
 Nipe Glacier
 Oberst Glacier
 Sal Glacier

Hills
"Austkampane" means "the east crags."
"Blåklettane" means "the blue hills."
"Bulken" means "the lump."
"Glashaugen" means "the glass hill."
"Isklakken" means "the ice lump."
"Kaggen" means "the keg."
Kamp Glacier Hills: three hills border the east side of Kamp Glacier.
Nordhaugen: the northernmost; "Nordhaugen" means "the north hill."
Mehaugen: the middle hill; "Mehaugen" means "the middle hill."
Sørhaugen: the southernmost; "Sørdhaugen" means "the south hill."
"Krakken"  means "the stool."
"Lågkollane" means "the low hills."

Nunataks 
 Devoldkalven: a  nunatak near Devold Peak in the high section of Byrdbreen glacier. Named for Antarctic explorer Hallvard Devold.
"Dotten" means "the lump."
"Nordtoppen" means "the north peak."
"Småhausane" means "the small crags."
Taggen: stands between Borchgrevinkisen and Kreitzerisen glaciers in the western part of the range. "Taggen" means "the prong."
"Teltet" means "the tent."
 Tertene Nunataks: a group of small nunataks on the west side of Kreitzerisen. "Tertene means "the tarts."
"Trillingane" means "the triplets."
Named Utsteinen ("the outer stone") because of its position. Belgian research station Princess Elisabeth Base was established on this nunatak in 2009.
"Vesthaugen" means "the west hill."

Rock outcroppings 
"Bleikskoltane" means "the pale knolls."
Bollene Rocks: a group of rocks just west of the Bleikskoltane Rocks at the head of Byrdbreen. "Bollene" means "the buns."
Pukkelen Rocks: a rock outcropping just west of the Bollene Rocks at the head of Byrdbreen. "Pukkelen" means "the hump."
"Roysane" means "the pile of stones."

Other
Bulkisen: a blue ice field between Austhamaren Peak and Bulken Hill. Named Bulkisen because of association with Bulken Hill.
Byrdbreen
"Kvalfinnen" means "the whale fin", and it was named for its shape.
"Smalegga" means "the narrow ridge."

See also 
 Mount Romnaes, an isolated mountain close to this range
Russkiye Mountains, a mountain range between the Sør Rondane Mountains and the Hoel Mountains
 Tangekilen Bay, an indentation of the ice shelf north of the Sør Rondane Mountains

References

Mountain ranges of Queen Maud Land
Princess Ragnhild Coast